Annalee Newitz (born May 7, 1969) is an American journalist, editor, and author of both fiction and nonfiction, who has written for the periodicals Popular Science and Wired. From 1999 to 2008 Newitz wrote a syndicated weekly column called Techsploitation, and from 2000 to 2004 was the culture editor of the San Francisco Bay Guardian. In 2004 Newitz became a policy analyst at the Electronic Frontier Foundation. With Charlie Jane Anders, they also co-founded Other magazine, a periodical that ran from 2002 to 2007. From 2008 to 2015 Newitz was editor-in-chief of Gawker-owned media venture io9, and subsequently its direct descendant Gizmodo, Gawker's design and technology blog. As of 2019, Newitz is a contributing opinion writer at The New York Times.

Early life
Newitz was born in 1969, and grew up in Irvine, California, graduating from Irvine High School, and in 1987 moved to Berkeley, California. In 1996, Newitz started doing freelance writing, and in 1998 completed a Ph.D. in English and American Studies from UC Berkeley, with a dissertation on images of monsters, psychopaths, and capitalism in twentieth century American popular culture, the content of which later appeared in book form from Duke University Press.

Around 1999, Newitz co-founded the Post-World War II American Literature and Culture Database in an attempt to chronicle modern literature and popular culture.

Career
Newitz became a full-time writer and journalist in 1999 with an invitation to write a weekly column for the Metro Silicon Valley, a column which then ran in various venues for nine years. Newitz then served as the culture editor at the San Francisco Bay Guardian from 2000 to 2004.

Newitz was awarded a Knight Science Journalism Fellowship for 2002 to 2003, supporting them as a research fellow at Massachusetts Institute of Technology. From 2004 to 2005 Newitz was a policy analyst for the Electronic Frontier Foundation, and from 2007 to 2009 was on the board of Computer Professionals for Social Responsibility. Newitz and Charlie Jane Anders, a Hugo award-winning author and commentator, co-founded Other magazine.

In 2008, Gawker media asked Newitz to start a blog about science and science fiction, dubbed io9, for which Newitz served as editor-in-chief from its founding until 2015 when it merged with Gizmodo, another Gawker media design and technology blog property; Newitz then took on the same leadership of the new venture. In November 2015, Newitz left Gawker to join Ars Technica, where Newitz has been employed as tech culture editor since December 2015. Newitz is a contributing opinion writer at The New York Times.

Newitz's first novel, Autonomous, was published in 2017. Autonomous won the Lambda Award and was nominated for the Nebula Award and Locus Award in 2018 for best novel.

Newitz's second novel, The Future of Another Timeline, published in 2019, was described on  Newitz's website as: "[...] about time travel and what it would be like to meet yourself as a teenager and have a really, really intense conversation with her about how fucked up your high school friends are." The book was received with acclaim by critics, and was a Locus Award nominee for Best Science Fiction Novel.
 
Their 2014 non-fiction science book Scatter, Adapt, and Remember: How Humans Will Survive a Mass Extinction was a finalist for the L.A. Times Book Prize. They also wrote Four Lost Cities: A Secret History of the Urban Age, published in 2021.

They have also written for publications including Wired, Popular Science, the New Yorker, the Atlantic, Slate, Washington Post, Smithsonian Magazine, and more. They have published short stories in Lightspeed, Shimmer, Apex, and Technology Review's Twelve Tomorrows.

In March 2018, with their partner and co-host Charlie Jane Anders, Newitz launched the podcast Our Opinions Are Correct, which “explor[es] the meaning of science fiction, and how it’s relevant to real-life science and society.” The podcast won the Hugo Award for Best Fancast in 2019.

Personal life

Newitz is the child of two English teachers: Newitz's mother, Cynthia, worked at a high school, and Newitz's father, Marty, at a community college. Since 2000, Newitz has been in a relationship with Charlie Jane Anders. The two began the podcast Our Opinions Are Correct in March 2018.

Newitz has used they pronouns since 2019.

Venues
 Co-founder, Bad Subjects, 1992
 Co-founder, other (magazine), 2002
 Co-founder, Editor in chief, io9.com, Gawker Media's science and science fiction blog
 Editor in chief, Gizmodo, Gawker Media's technology blog
 Tech culture editor, Ars Technica

Awards & nominations 

 Autonomous (Tor Books, September 2017) 
 Finalist for 2018 Nebula Award for Best Novel
 Finalist for 2018 John W. Campbell Memorial Award
 Finalist for 2018 Locus Award for Best First Novel
Winner of 2018 Lambda Award SF/Fantasy/Horror
Winner of 2019 Theodore Sturgeon Memorial Award for best short science fiction - "When Robot and Crow Saved East St. Louis"
Winner of 2019 Hugo Award for Best Fancast - Our Opinions Are Correct
Future of Another Timeline (2019)
Finalist for Locus Award for Best Science Fiction Novel (2020) 
Nominee for Goodreads Choice Award for Science Fiction (2019)
Winner (long-form) of Sidewise Award for Alternate History (2019)

Bibliography

Newitz's work has been published in Popular Science, Wired, Salon.com, New Scientist, Metro Silicon Valley, the San Francisco Bay Guardian, and at AlterNet. In addition to these print and online periodicals, they have published the following short stories and books:

Novels
 Autonomous (Tor Books, September 2017) (translated in German as Autonom in 2018)
 The Future of Another Timeline (Tor Books, 2019) 
 The Terraformers (Tor Books, 2023)

Short stories
 "The Great Oxygen Race", Hilobrow magazine, 2010
 "The Gravity Fetishist", Flurb magazine, 2010
 "Twilight of the Eco-Terrorist", Apex Magazine, 2011
 "Unclaimed", Shimmer Magazine, issue 18, 2014
 "Drones Don't Kill People", Lightspeed Magazine, issue 54, 2014
 "All Natural Organic Microbes", MIT's Twelve Tomorrows, 2016
 "Birth of the Ant Rights Movement", Ars Technica UK, 2016
 "The Blue Fairy's Manifesto", Robots vs. Fairies, ed. by Dominik Parisien and Navah Wolfe, 2018
 "When Robot and Crow Saved East St. Louis", Slate, 2018. Winner of the 2019 Theodore Sturgeon Memorial Award for best short science fiction.

Non-fiction
  Co-edited, with Matt Wray
 
 
  Co-edited with Charlie Anders.
 
  Edited by Kathryn Cramer and Ed Finn.
 
  Edited by Nalo Hopkinson.

References

Further reading
 Archived issues of  other magazine, Wayback Machine. Retrieved February 19, 2015.
 Sussman, Matt (April 9, 2010), "The Daily Blurgh: Bros before trolls", San Francisco Bay Guardian
 Hughes, James (December 26, 2009), "Science Saturday", blogginghead.tv
 Interview with the author (October 2017), Annalee Newitz: Reprogramming, Locus Magazine

External links

 Official site
 Annalee Newitz: Gettingit.com authors
 Annalee Newitz at AlterNet columnists
 Annalee Newitz at the Internet Speculative Fiction Database
 Annalee Newitz, "She's Such A Geek" Interview at 23C3
 Annalee Newitz and Charlie Anders read from "She's Such A Geek": Authors@Google

1969 births
Living people
American technology writers
American bloggers
People from Irvine, California
American science writers
Journalists from California
Writers from San Francisco
20th-century American journalists
21st-century American journalists
Lambda Literary Award winners
Sidewise Award winners
American LGBT novelists
21st-century LGBT people